Carpenters Island is an island in the Little Tennessee River in Loudon County, Tennessee. It is shown on United States Geographical Survey map USGS Meadow quad.  The nearest major town is Loudon, Tennessee.  One early official mention of it is in Examination and Survey of Little Tennessee River, Tennessee, U.S. House of Representatives Document No. 66, 56th Congress, 2nd Session, 1900, plate 1.

References

Landforms of Loudon County, Tennessee
River islands of Tennessee